Chesapeake is a town in Kanawha County, West Virginia, United States. The population was 1,336 at the 2020 census. The town is situated on the Kanawha River. Chesapeake was incorporated on November 1, 1948 as recorded in Book 67 Page 123-124, and named for the Chesapeake and Ohio Railway, which has served the community since 1873. It is also the hometown of NFL player Chris Massey, long snapper for the St. Louis Rams. The current Mayor of Chesapeake is Jack Lavender.

Geography

Demographics

2010 census
At the 2010 census there were 1,554 people, 691 households, and 425 families living in the town. The racial makeup of the town was 88.7% White, 9.6% African American, 0.2% Native American, 0.2% from other races, and 1.4% from two or more races. Hispanic or Latino of any race were 0.5%.

Of the 691 households 26.6% had children under the age of 18 living with them, 38.9% were married couples living together, 18.4% had a female householder with no husband present, 4.2% had a male householder with no wife present, and 38.5% were non-families. 33.6% of households were one person and 14.3% were one person aged 65 or older. The average household size was 2.25 and the average family size was 2.84.

The median age in the town was 43.5 years. 20.8% of residents were under the age of 18; 7.3% were between the ages of 18 and 24; 23.6% were from 25 to 44; 30.9% were from 45 to 64; and 17.4% were 65 or older. The gender makeup of the town was 47.1% male and 52.9% female.

2000 census
At the 2000 census there were 1,643 people, 750 households, and 480 families living in the town. The population density was 3,487.3 inhabitants per square mile (1,349.7/km). There were 851 housing units at an average density of 1,806.3 per square mile (699.1/km).  The racial makeup of the town was 88.19% White, 10.04% African American, 0.06% Native American, 0.12% Asian, 0.06% Pacific Islander, 0.37% from other races, and 1.16% from two or more races. Hispanic or Latino of any race were 0.37%.

Of the 750 households 22.8% had children under the age of 18 living with them, 42.3% were married couples living together, 16.9% had a female householder with no husband present, and 35.9% were non-families. 31.5% of households were one person and 15.6% were one person aged 65 or older. The average household size was 2.19 and the average family size was 2.71.

The age distribution was 19.7% under the age of 18, 6.9% from 18 to 24, 25.9% from 25 to 44, 27.1% from 45 to 64, and 20.3% 65 or older. The median age was 43 years. For every 100 females, there were 83.2 males. For every 100 females age 18 and over, there were 80.2 males.

The median household income was $29,526 and the median family income  was $35,703. Males had a median income of $30,588 versus $21,458 for females. The per capita income for the town was $16,307. About 14.3% of families and 19.1% of the population were below the poverty line, including 38.9% of those under age 18 and 10.9% of those age 65 or over.

References

Towns in Kanawha County, West Virginia
Towns in West Virginia
Populated places on the Kanawha River
Charleston, West Virginia metropolitan area